Montagnac-d'Auberoche is a commune in the Dordogne department in Nouvelle-Aquitaine in southwestern France. The village is situated on a hill near the river Auvézère, 19 km east of Périgueux.

Population

See also
Communes of the Dordogne department

References

Communes of Dordogne